The Best of Rogério Skylab is a compilation album by the Brazilian musician Rogério Skylab. It was released in 2010 through independent label Discobertas, and compiled by journalist Marcelo Fróes. It contains 20 of Skylab's greatest hits, ranging from Skylab (1999) to Skylab VIII (2008).

Track listing
All tracks produced by Rogério Skylab, except for tracks 1–8 by Robertinho do Recife.

References

2010 compilation albums
Rogério Skylab albums
Obscenity controversies in music